Budyonnovsky (masculine), Budyonnovskaya (feminine), or Budyonnovskoye (neuter) is the name of several rural localities in Russia:
Budennovsky, Republic of Bashkortostan, a village in Baltiysky Selsoviet of Iglinsky District of the Republic of Bashkortostan
Budennovsky, Kursk Oblast, a settlement in Melovsky Selsoviet of Dmitriyevsky District of Kursk Oblast
Budennovsky, Volgograd Oblast, a khutor in Krasnokorotkovsky Selsoviet of Novoanninsky District of Volgograd Oblast
Budennovskaya, a stanitsa in Budennovskoye Rural Settlement of Proletarsky District of Rostov Oblast